The Metropolitan School District of Washington Township (MSDWT) is a public school district in Indianapolis, Indiana.  The district was established in 1955 and serves the area of Washington Township that was outside of the city limits before the city and county were merged in 1970.  As of 2016–17, MSDWT had approximately 11,482 students in grades K-12.

Schools

High school

North Central High School

Middle schools
Eastwood Middle School
Northview Middle School
Westlane Middle School

Elementary schools
Allisonville Elementary School
Clearwater Elementary School
Crooked Creek Elementary School
Fox Hill Elementary School
Greenbriar Elementary School
Nora Elementary School
Spring Mill Elementary School
Willow Lake Elementary

Career center
J. Everett Light Career Center

Early childhood development
 Wyandotte School closed at the beginning of the 2008-2009 School Year
 Harcourt Elementary school closed at the 2008-2009 year

Wyandotte School
Wyandotte is located at 3575 E. 79th Street, Indianapolis, IN  46240.  Wyandotte is a Pre-K and K elementary school.  Wyandotte is responsible for the kindergarten population for Allisonville and John Strange elementary schools.  Full day kindergarten is available; however, it is tuition based.  As of 2005–06, the annual tuition was approximately $2,300 for full day kindergarten.  Half day kindergarten is paid for by the state.  Approximately 50% of the kindergarten enrollment attend full day classes.

Further programs include AYS.  AYS program handles Pre-K (3-5) children in a structured early childhood development program.  AYS also provides before school and after-school care for half and full day kindergarten students.  AYS programs are provided at extra cost.

The Early Childhood Special Education Preschool is housed at Wyandotte School as part of the public school system. It is developed for children ages three to five with identified special needs.

The Wyandotte Youth Support Academy, which is funded by Lilly Endowment, offers elementary, middle school students, and parents an educational alternative to out-of-school suspension. W.Y.S.A. provides the students with education in character values, individualized instruction, and computer based education. W.Y.S.A. is designed to reduce the numbers of out-of-school suspensions, and to improve overall student achievement while addressing student disciplinary problems.

Because of budgetary constraints, Wyandotte may be closed at the end of the 07/08 school year.  The kindergarten students, for Allisonville and John Strange, will attend school at John Strange for the next few years.  John Strange has been under capacity for over four years.  The strategic plan is to have all kindergarten students, after physical additions and remodeling work is completed, attend their home elementary.  This plan is dependent on future funding being approved by the school board and the citizens of the school district.

External links
 District web site
 Indiana Department of Education school data

Washington Township
Education in Indianapolis
School districts established in 1955
1955 establishments in Indiana